Hoggestabben Butte is a prominent butte,  high, standing  north of Mount Hochlin and being its highest northern outlier, in the Mühlig-Hofmann Mountains of Queen Maud Land, Antarctica. It was mapped by Norwegian cartographers from surveys and air photos by the Sixth Norwegian Antarctic Expedition (1956–60) and named Hoggestabben (the chopping block).

References

Buttes of Antarctica
Landforms of Queen Maud Land
Princess Martha Coast